The Bryggen inscriptions are a find of some 670 medieval runic inscriptions on wood (mostly pine) and bone found from 1955 and forth at Bryggen (and its surroundings) in Bergen, Norway. It has been called the most important runic find in the twentieth century. Before the find of these inscriptions, there was doubt whether the runes were ever used for anything else than inscriptions of names and solemn phrases. The Bryggen find showed the everyday use that runes had in this area, and presumably in other parts of Scandinavia as well. Another important aspect of the find was that many of the inscriptions were obviously at least as recent as the 14th century. Previously it was believed that the use of runes in Norway had died out long before.

The inscriptions have numbers for Bergen finds, mostly "B" followed by three figures.

Many of the inscriptions follow the formula Eysteinn á mik (Eysteinn owns me, B001), and were most likely used as markers of property – like modern-day name tags. Some contain short messages of different types, such as Ást min, kyss mik (my darling, kiss me, B017) and others have longer messages such as business letters and orders. Yet others contain short religious inscriptions, often in Latin, such as Rex Judæorum In nomine Patris Nazarenus (B005) and may have been intended as amulets.

The inscriptions are currently kept at Bryggens Museum in Bergen, and some are on display.

Examples found at Bryggen or nearby

Other interesting inscriptions
 One of the inscriptions, listed as N B145, refers to the pagan Norns. It has both a complete Skaldic dróttkvætt verse and Virgil's famous verse "Omnia vincit amor et nos cedamus amori" engraved.
 Another one, listed as N B368 M was written on the wax tablet and was supposed to be hidden under the layer of wax with some trivial writing. It was a top-secret message calling to someone to change the sides in the civil war: "I would ask you this, that you leave your party. Cut a letter in runes to Ólafr Hettusveinn's sister. She is in the convent in Bergen. Ask her and your kin for advice when you want to come to terms. You, surely, are less stubborn than the Earl." The letter was continued on another wax tablet.  Ólafr Hettusveinn is probably Olav Ugjæva, died in 1169.
 N B257 (dated ca. 1335) is a poetic charm, apparently a piece of love magic, similar in content to a curse in the Eddaic poem Skírnismál.
 Likewise, N B380 contains a pagan inscription, reading ”May you be healthy, and in good spirits. May Þórr receive you, may Óðinn own you.”

See also 
 Birch bark document
 List of runestones

References

External links
Database with the runes from Bryggen
Report on computerizing the Bryggen runes

Bibliography 
Spurkland, Terje (2005): Norwegian Runes and Runic Inscriptions, Translated by Betsy van der Hoek, Boydell Press, Woodbridge

Skaldic poetry
Runic inscriptions
 
History of Bergen